The men's 4 × 396 metres relay event at the 1974 European Athletics Indoor Championships was held on 9 March in Gothenburg. The athletes ran two laps for each leg, like in modern indoor relay races, but because the track was only 196 metres long, it resulted in an unusual distance of 392 metres for each runner.

Results

References

4 × 400 metres relay at the European Athletics Indoor Championships
Relay